Muhammad III was the third Layzanshah (king of Layzan, r. 917–948) and the seventh Shirvanshah (king of Shirvan, r. 948–956). He was the son of Abu Tahir Yazid.

Biography 
Muhammad III is first mentioned in 917, when he was appointed as the ruler of Layzan and Tabarsaran by his father Abu Tahir ibn Yazid. When Muhammad's father died in 948, he succeeded him as the ruler of Shirvan, and appointed his son Ahmad as the ruler of Layzan, while his other son Haytham ibn Muhammad was appointed as the ruler of Tabarsaran. From 948 to 956, Muhammad constantly raided the territories of the non-Muslims, who are called "infidels" in Muslim sources.

On 4 June 956, Muhammad died of small-pox. However, according to another source, he was poisoned by his vizier Ibn al-Maraghi. The reason for that was because, when Muhammad was suffering from small-pox, Ibn al-Maraghi used the opportunity to kill the imprisoned brother of Muhammad and had his body hidden. When Muhammad miraculously survived the illness, he ordered the release of his brother. Ibn al-Maraghi, who feared that his life was in danger, had Muhammad poisoned. Ahmad then succeeded Muhammad as the ruler of Shirvan.

References

Sources 
 

10th-century rulers in Asia
956 deaths
Deaths by poisoning